Selbyville is an unincorporated community along the Right Fork Buckhannon River in Upshur County, West Virginia, United States.

The community was named after Lord Selby.

Selbyville's public schools are operated by Upshur County Schools.

References

Unincorporated communities in Upshur County, West Virginia
Unincorporated communities in West Virginia